Pratyul Joshi (born 11 December 1985) is an Indian singer and songwriter. He is also a former street performer in Mumbai.

Quotes 
The music we make can last a lifetime

References

1985 births
Living people
Indian male singer-songwriters
Indian singer-songwriters
Place of birth missing (living people)